Henry James Davies (born 1876) was an English footballer who played in the Football League for Doncaster Rovers, Gainsborough Trinity, Hull City and Wolverhampton Wanderers. His son of the same name was also a footballer.

References

1876 births
Date of death unknown
English footballers
English Football League players
Doncaster Rovers F.C. players
Leicester City F.C. players
Hull City A.F.C. players
Gainsborough Trinity F.C. players
Wolverhampton Wanderers F.C. players
Association football defenders